The Jin River is a river in China's Jiangxi and Guangdong provinces. It is a right tributary of Guangdong's Bei or North River.

Geography
It rises in the southwestern Chongyi County, Jiangxi Province. The upper stream is called Changjiang Creek. The river runs southward joins Bei River at Baimangba, Renhua County in Guangdong Province.

See also
 Other Jin Rivers
 Rivers of China

References

Rivers of Jiangxi
Rivers of Guangdong